The sentinel rock thrush (Monticola explorator) is a species of bird in the family Muscicapidae.
It is found in Lesotho, South Africa, and Swaziland.
Its natural habitat is subtropical or tropical high-altitude grassland.

References

sentinel rock thrush
Birds of Southern Africa
sentinel rock thrush
Taxa named by Louis Jean Pierre Vieillot
Taxonomy articles created by Polbot